The 1953–54 Landsdelsserien was a Norwegian second-tier football league season.

The league was contested by 54 teams, divided into a total of seven groups from four districts; Østland/Søndre, Østland/Nordre, Sørland/Vestre and Møre/Trøndelag. The two group winners in the Østland districts, Fram and Vålerengen promoted directly to the 1954–55 Hovedserien. The other five group winners qualified for promotion play-offs to compete for two spots in the following season's top flight. Brann and Ranheim won the play-offs and were promoted.

Tables

District Østland/Søndre

District Østland/Nordre

District Sørland/Vestland

Group A1

Group A2

Group B

District Møre/Trøndelag

Møre

Trøndelag

Promotion play-offs
Sørland/Vestland 
Results A1–A2
Flekkefjord 1–0 Bryne
Results A–B
Brann 6–0 Flekkefjord 

Brann won 6–0 over Flekkefjord and were promoted to Hovedserien.

Møre/Trøndelag
Ranheim 2–0 Molde

Ranheim won 2–0 over Molde and were promoted to Hovedserien.

References

Norwegian First Division seasons
1953 in Norwegian football
1954 in Norwegian football
Norway